Oscar Aldo Moglia Eiras (February 1, 1935 – October 8, 1989) was a basketball player from Uruguay.  He was Jewish.

Club career
During his club career, Moglia played with the Uruguayan team Club Atlético Welcome. He won five Uruguayan Federal Championships (1953, 1956, 1957, 1966, 1967). He was the league's second all-time highest scorer, after Fefo Ruiz, with 11,374 career total points scored.

National team career
With the senior Uruguayan national basketball team, Moglia was the top scorer in points per game, of the 1954 FIBA World Championship, with a scoring average of 18.7 points per game. He was also named to the All-Tournament Team. He won the bronze medal at the 1956 Summer Olympic Games, in Melbourne, Australia. He was also the leading scorer of that tournament, with a scoring average of 26.0 points per game.

He also played at the 1967 FIBA World Championship. He won gold medals at the 1953 FIBA South American Championship and the 1955 FIBA South American Championship, and a silver medal at the 1958 FIBA South American Championship. He was the leading scorer of the FIBA South American Championship three times, (1955, 1958, 1960).

On June 11, Moglia was inducted to the FIBA Hall of Fame, class of 2021

References

External links
 

1935 births
1989 deaths
Basketball players at the 1956 Summer Olympics
Club Atlético Welcome basketball players
Jewish men's basketball players
Medalists at the 1956 Summer Olympics
Olympic basketball players of Uruguay
Olympic bronze medalists for Uruguay
Olympic medalists in basketball
Small forwards
Sportspeople from Montevideo
Uruguayan Jews
Uruguayan men's basketball players
1967 FIBA World Championship players
Uruguayan people of Italian descent
FIBA Hall of Fame inductees
1954 FIBA World Championship players